Fatha may refer to
Earl "Fatha" Hines,  American jazz pianist and bandleader
Fatha, Iraq, area and geological formation
 Fatḥah, Arabic diacritic
 ـَ'  (fatha), Arabic Braille